George William Darby  (February 5, 1869 – February 25, 1937) was a professional baseball player. He was a pitcher for the Cincinnati Reds of the National League in 1893.

References

1869 births
1937 deaths
Major League Baseball pitchers
Baseball players from Kansas City, Missouri
Cincinnati Reds players
19th-century baseball players
Peoria Canaries players
Sacramento Senators players
Pendleton Ho Hos players
Portland Gladiators players
San Francisco Metropolitans players
Omaha Omahogs players
Atlanta Windjammers players
Kansas City Cowboys (minor league) players
Kansas City Blues (baseball) players
Victoria Chappies players
Detroit Tigers (Western League) players
Fort Wayne Indians players
Toledo Mud Hens players